Gates of the Arctic National Park and Preserve is an American national park that protects portions of the Brooks Range in northern Alaska. The park is the northernmost national park in the United States, situated entirely north of the Arctic Circle.

Gates of the Arctic was initially designated as a national monument on December 1, 1978, before being redesignated as a national park and preserve upon passage of the Alaska National Interest Lands Conservation Act in 1980. The wilderness area adjoins the Noatak Wilderness. Together, they form the largest contiguous wilderness in the United States.

Park purpose
According to the National Park website:

Activities

There are no roads or official trails in Gates of the Arctic National Park and Preserve. Owing to its remoteness and lack of supportive infrastructure, the park is the least visited national park in the U.S., and one of the least visited areas in the entire U.S. National Park System, which also includes national monuments, recreation areas, preserves, and historic sites. In 2021, the park received just 7,362 recreation visitors, while Grand Canyon National Park received about 4.5 million visitors (over 600 times as many) in the same year.

Camping is permitted throughout the park, but may be restricted by easements when crossing Native Corporation lands within the park.

The park headquarters is in Fairbanks. Park Service operations in the park are managed from the Bettles Ranger Station, to the south of the park.

Geography

Gates of the Arctic National Park and Preserve lies to the west of the Dalton Highway, centered on the Brooks Range and covering the north and south slopes of the mountains. The park includes the Endicott Mountains and part of the Schwatka Mountains. The majority of Gates of the Arctic is designated as national park, in which only subsistence hunting by local rural residents is permitted. Sport hunting is only permitted in the national preserve. To hunt and trap in the preserve, a person must have all required licenses and permits and follow all other state regulations.

The eastern boundary of the park generally follows the Dalton Highway at a distance of a few miles, with the westernmost part of the Arctic National Wildlife Refuge  farther east.  Kanuti National Wildlife Refuge is near the park's southeast boundary. Noatak National Preserve adjoins the western boundary, and the National Petroleum Reserve–Alaska adjoins the northwest corner of the park. Almost all of the park is designated as wilderness, with the exception of areas around Anaktuvuk Pass. A detached portion of the park surrounds the outlying Fortress Mountain and Castle Mountain to the north of the park.

Ten small communities outside the park's boundaries are classified as "resident zone communities" and depend on park resources for food and livelihood. They are Alatna, Allakaket, Ambler, Anaktuvuk Pass, Bettles, Evansville, Hughes, Kobuk, Nuiqsut, Shungnak, and Wiseman. There are no established roads, trails, visitor facilities, or campgrounds in the park.  The Dalton Highway (Alaska State Highway 11) comes within five miles (8 km) of the park's eastern boundary, but requires a river crossing to reach the park from the road. The Arctic Interagency Visitor Center in nearby Coldfoot is open from late May to early September, providing information on the parks, preserves and refuges of the Brooks Range, Yukon Valley and the North Slope. About  of the park and preserve are owned by native corporations or the State of Alaska.  are protected in the Gates of the Arctic Wilderness.

The park contains mountains such as the Arrigetch Peaks and Mount Igikpak. The park also features six Wild and Scenic Rivers:
Alatna River 
John River 
Kobuk River 
the North Fork of the Koyukuk River 
part of the Noatak River
Tinayguk River

Climate

According to the Köppen climate classification system, Gates of the Arctic National Park and Preserve has a Subarctic with Cool Summers and Year Around Rainfall Climate (Dfc). Perennial snowfields and glaciers, which are crucial to various ecosystems within the park, are decreasing at a rapid rate due to warming temperatures. From 1985 to 2017, the area of these snowfields decreased in size by 13 km2. These warming temperatures have also resulted in the thawing of permafrost which has directly affected the stability of the soil. As permafrost thaws, it exposes the bare soil to the elements which leads to erosion and slope failures.

Geology

The park includes much of the central and eastern Brooks Range. It extends to the east as far as the Middle Fork of the Koyukuk River, which is paralleled by the Dalton Highway and the Trans-Alaska Pipeline. The park straddles the continental divide, separating the drainages of the Pacific and Arctic Oceans. The northernmost section of the park includes small portions of the Arctic foothills tundra. The Brooks Range occupies the central section of the park, running on an east-west line. To the south of the Brooks Range the Ambler-Chandalar Ridge, with associated valleys and lakes, runs east-west. The southernmost portion of the park includes the Kobuk-Selawik Lowlands, with the headwaters of the Kobuk River. The Brooks Range has seen repeated glaciation, with the most recent called the Itkillik glaciation from about 24,000 years ago to roughly 1500 to 1200 years before the present.

Ecology

The boreal forest extends to about 68 degrees north latitude, characterized by black and white spruce mixed with poplar. To the north of that line, which coincides with the spine of the Brooks Range,  lies cold-arid land that has been described as "Arctic desert." During the long winters temperatures can reach , but can reach  for a short time in summer. The park lies above the Arctic circle.

Fauna include brown bears, black bears, muskoxen, moose, Dall sheep, timber wolves, wolverines, coyotes, lynxes, Arctic ground squirrels, lemmings, voles, marmots, porcupines, river otters, red and Arctic fox species, beavers, wood frogs, snowshoe hares, collared pikas, muskrats, Arctic terns, bald eagles, golden eagles, peregrine falcons, ospreys, wolves, great horned and northern hawk-owls. More than half a million caribou, including the Central Arctic, Western Arctic, Teshekpuk, and Porcupine herds, migrate through the central Brooks Range twice yearly, traveling north in summer, and south in winter. Caribou are important as a food source to native peoples. However, the decreasing size of perennial snowfields within the park may decrease the size of this caribou population. The park is the northernmost range limit for the Dall sheep. About 132 brown bears reside in the park and preserve, based on a density of about one bear per .

History

Nomadic peoples have inhabited the Brooks Range for as many as 12,500 years, living mainly on caribou and other wildlife. The Mesa site at Iteriak Creek has yielded evidence of occupation between 11,500 and 10,300 years before the present. Later sites from around 6,000 years before present have yielded projectile points, stone knives and net sinkers. The Arctic small tool tradition (ASTt) of about 4,500 BP has also been documented. A late phase of the ASTt from between 2500 and 950 BP, the Ipuitak phase, has been documented in the park at the Bateman Site at Itkillik Lake.

The earliest Inupiat people appeared about 1200 AD at the coast and spread to the Brooks Range, becoming the Nunamiut. The Nunamiut people, who had left much of their traditional homelands following a crash in the caribou populations in the early 1900s, resumed a relatively isolated subsistence way of life after returning to the mountains in the late 1930s.  In 1949 the last two semi-nomadic bands came together in the valley of the Anaktuvuk River, and over the next decade established the community of Anaktuvuk Pass. The Gwich'in people, a Northern Athabaskan group also lived in the area in the last 1000 years, moving south of the park in historic times.

The Alaskan interior was not explored until the late 19th century, shortly before discovery of gold in the Klondike brought prospectors to Alaska. Some encampments of explorers and survey parties have been identified in the park. A few small mining operations were established in the early 20th century, never amounting to much.

The park's name dates to 1929, when wilderness activist Bob Marshall, exploring the North Fork of the Koyukuk River, encountered a pair of mountains (Frigid Crags and Boreal Mountain), one on each side of the river. He christened this portal the "Gates of the Arctic." Marshall spent time in Wiseman during the early 1930s, publishing an account of the place in his 1933 book Arctic Village. In the 1940s writer and researcher Olaus Murie proposed that Alaskan lands be preserved.

Proposals for a national park in the Brooks Range first emerged in the 1960s, and in 1968 a National Park Service survey team recommended the establishment of a  park in the area. That year, Secretary of the Interior Stewart Udall recommended to President Lyndon B. Johnson that Johnson use the Antiquities Act to proclaim a national monument  in the Brooks Range and other Alaskan locations, but Johnson declined. During the 1970s the Alaska Native Claims Settlement Act (ANCSA) prompted serious examination of the disposition of lands held by the federal government. A series of bills were considered to deal with conservation land proposals authorized under ANCSA, but the legislation that would become the Alaska National Interest Lands Conservation Act (ANILCA) was held up in Congress in the late 1970s. Consequently, on December 1, 1978 President Jimmy Carter used the Antiquities Act to proclaim much of the proposed new Alaskan parklands as national monuments, including Gates of the Arctic National Monument. In 1980 Congress passed ANILCA, and the monument became Gates of the Arctic National Park and Preserve on December 2, 1980.

See also
List of national parks of the United States

References

Bibliography
 Marshall, Robert (1956), Alaska Wilderness, George Marshall ed.,  (2005 reprint), University of California Press 
 Marshall, Robert (1933), Arctic Village. H. Smith and R. Haas, New York.

External links

 Official website - National Park Service
 Alaskan parklands - National Park Service

 
ANILCA establishments